Flight 20 may refer to:

Capital Airlines Flight 20, crashed on 18 January 1960
Aeroflot Flight 20/101, crashed on 4 January 1965
Taquan Air Flight 20, crashed on 20 May 2019

0020